is a 2008 Japanese film directed by Masato Harada.

The film is about a newspaper editor (played by Shin'ichi Tsutsumi) who deals with the crash of Japan Airlines Flight 123.

Accolades
51st Blue Ribbon Awards
 Best Film
 Best Supporting Actor - Masato Sakai

References

External links

 
 "Narratives on the World's Worst Plane Crash: Flight JL123 in Print and on Screen" (Archive) by Hood, C.P. (2009), Research Seminar Paper, Ref No.7, Cardiff Crimes Narrative Network, Cardiff University

2008 films
2000s Japanese-language films
Japanese aviation films
Films directed by Masato Harada
2000s Japanese films